The JCB Fastrac is a high-speed agricultural tractor series manufactured by JCB Landpower, part of the JCB group.

Production began in 1991, with continual development to the present day.

Engine 
All models have six-cylinder diesel engines. Initially supplied by Perkins Engines then Cummins, the current supplier is AGCO SISU Power.

Gearbox 
Three different gearboxes have been fitted to the Fastrac in production.

 The first type has evolved over several years.
 On introduction of the Fastrac this style of gearbox had 18 forward gears (6×3) and 6 reverse (6×1). These were organised as 6 manual gears in each of 3 ranges (Low, Medium and High). The range box also selected reverse giving 6 reverse gears with speeds similar to medium in forwards. All gear changes were made with the use of a dry clutch.
 This gearbox then had a 2-speed powershift section added after the dry clutch and before the 6-speed gearbox. This resulted in 36 forward gears (2×6×3) and 12 reverse (2×6×1).
 Following this the 2-speed powershift section was changed to 3-speed version. Giving 54 forward gears (3×6×3) and 18 reverse gears (3×6×1)
 The latest version of this gearbox a wet clutch replaced the dry clutch still with 54 forward and 18 reverse gears.

The second type fitted to 4000, 8250, 8280 and 8310 Fastrac models features a CVT (IVT) hydrostatic power-split gearbox which is one of the most advanced tractor gearboxes available.
The third type developed most recently and fitted to 7000 Series and 3000 Xtra machines has a wet main clutch, a six-speed powershift section and a four-speed range box. As reverse is at the front of the powershift section the reverse gears are spread throughout the speed range. This arrangement gives 24 forward gears (2×3×4) and 12 reverse gears (1×3×4). Note that the top three reverse gears are not available for use.

Four wheel drive
All models are selectable four-wheel drive. The rear axle is driven as standard and drive to the front axle selected by the driver, through a hydraulically controlled clutch. This clutch is sprung on to give four-wheel drive and hydraulically disengaged to give two-wheel drive.

Axles
Most Fastrac axles have a central differential and epicyclic gearing reduction units built into the hub ends, where the wheel bolts.

The 7000 Series rear axle has a central differential and has in-board epicyclic gearing reduction units.

Axle locking differentials
A standard locking differential is provided in the rear axle of all machines.

100, 1000, 2000 and 4000 Series machines have a Detroit No-Spin-style differential lock in front axle.

3000, 7000 and 8000 Series machines have a driver-controlled clutch pack engaged locking differential.

PTO 
A two-speed power take-off (PTO) is standard at the rear and a factory option at the front. Depending on the model either speeds of 1000/540 or 1000/750 are available.

Suspension 
Multi-link suspension is fitted between the chassis and both the front and rear beam axles.

The front suspension on most machines uses four links, a panhard rod and anti-roll bar. On the 4000 series a V-link is used at the front.

The rear suspension uses two lower link and a V-link on top plus an anti-roll bar.

Hydropneumatic suspension is used on the rear of all models and on the front of the 4000 and 7000 series Fastrac. This is similar to that used on some Citroën cars.

Front axle steering 
1000, 2000 and 4000 Series Machines
These Fastrac machines have hydrostatic steering similar to most agricultural tractors with only a hydraulic link between the steering wheels and the front wheels.

100, 3000, 7000, 8250, 8280 and 8310 Series Machines
These machines have mechanical power steering similar to a large truck. This system gives a mechanical link between the steering wheel and the front wheels.

8290 and 8330 Machines
These machines have dual circuit hydrostatic steering allowing legal speeds over 60 km/h.

An automatic Global Positioning System-controlled steering system using a (Differential GPS) is available for the 3000, 4000, 7000 and 8000 series machines.

Rear axle steering 
Rear wheel steering (four-wheel steering) is available as an option on 2000 and 4000 series machines.
The electronic system has 5 modes of operation, and only allows four-wheel steering below .

 Two-Wheel Steer
 Proportional
 True Track
 Delay Mode
 Crab Steer

Brakes 
All models are fitted with large diameter external disc brakes at both front and rear individually on each wheel. An anti-lock braking system (ABS) is fitted on some models, depending on the maximum vehicle speed and legal requirements.

Auxiliary hydraulics 
An auxiliary hydraulic system (hydraulic drive system) is standard on all machines. It is used to control the front and rear linkages and through quick connectors at the front and rear of the tractor to control and power implements.

Three-point hitch 
A three-point hitch is standard at the rear of the machine and on option on front.

Rear trailer hitch
There are several types available depending on the country the machine is built for.
 Pick-up hitch
 PTO drawbar
 Rockinger ladder
 Grand Piton
 80 mm ball coupling

Cab
Traditionally the cab has been centrally mounted. Some models, the 7000 series and latter 8250, have the cab mounted at the rear of the tractor. The most recent fastrac iteration, the 4000 series tractors, have forward sloping cabs, similar to those on combine harvesters. All cabs have a full-size passenger seat and an air suspensioned driver's seat.

Models produced

This is not intended to be a complete list but includes the main models produced.
 125 and 145 (Discontinued) – The first models produced in 1991. Fitted with Perkins 6L engines
 135 and 155 (Discontinued) – Updated 125 and 145 models
 185 (Discontinued) – The first machine to use the Cummins 5.9L engine
 1115 and 1135 (Discontinued) – The first smaller Fastrac with hydrostatic steering
 2115 and 2135 (Discontinued) – Updated 1115 and 2135 models
 2150 (Discontinued)- Larger 2000 series machine (No 4WS option)
 3155 and 3185 (Discontinued) – Upgraded machines developed from the 155 and 185
 3190 and 3220 (Discontinued) – Machines fitted with Cummins 5.9L engines using electronic fuel injection
 3200 and 3230 (Discontinued) – Machines fitted with Cummins 6.7L engines using electronic fuel injection
 8250 (Discontinued) – The only Fastrac fitted with a CVT gearbox and an 8.3L Cummins engine
 2155 and 2170 (Discontinued) – Updated 2000 series with 6.7L Cummins engines
 7170, 7200 and 7230 (Discontinued) – A new range of machines with a 6×4 gearbox and 6.7L Cummins engines
 7270 (Discontinued) – A 270 hp 7000 series machine fitted with a 6.7L Cummins engine, launched at SIMA 2009
 3200 and 3230 Xtra (Discontinued) – The 3000 series machines are now fitted with the 6×4 gearbox and Cummins 6.7L engine.
 8280 and 8310 (Discontinued) – Machines fitted with AGCO SISU Power 8.4L engines and CVT gearbox
 3200 and 3230 Xtra (Discontinued) – The 3000 series machines shown at Agritechnica 2011 with SISU 7.4L Engines and 6x4 gearbox
 4160, 4190 and 4220 Models, now in production, fitted with AGCO SISU Power 6.6L T4f and StV engines, CVT gearbox and Four-Wheel Steer
 8290 and 8330 Models – Machines fitted with AGCO SISU Power 8.4L T4f and StV engines and CVT gearbox

Worlds Fastest Tractor 

Feature in media 
A JCB Fastrac was chosen by BBC's Top Gear host Jeremy Clarkson. It was driven on the show around the Top Gear Test Track by The Stig, in a time of 2:57.4, making it the fastest of the three featured tractors, but also currently the fifth-slowest-ever lap time.

A JCB Fastrac appeared in news coverage of the JCB Dieselmax land speed record car, pushing it to its 30 mph starting speed.

In 2019 a modified JCB Fastrac broke the record for the world fastest tractor after it hit a top speed of 153.771mph.  The record was ratified by the Guinness World Records.

References

External links 

 Manufacturer's website

Tractors
JCB (company)